Trick For Trick; Or, The Debauch'd Hypocrite is a 1678 comedy play by the English writer Thomas D'Urfey. It was first staged at the Theatre Royal, Drury Lane by the King's Company.

The original Drury Lane cast included Michael Mohun as Sir Wilding Frollick, Charles Hart as  Monsieur Thomas, Philip Griffin as Valentine, Thomas Clark as Franck, Cardell Goodman as Hylas, Martin Powell as  Sir Peregreen, Joseph Haines as  Launce, John Coysh, Marmaduke Watson and Carey Perin as Physicians, Elizabeth Boutell as Cellida, Mary Corbett as Sabina and Mary Knep as Mrs Dorothy.

References

Bibliography
 McVeagh, John. Thomas Durfey and Restoration Drama: The Work of a Forgotten Writer. Routledge, 2017.
 Van Lennep, W. The London Stage, 1660-1800: Volume One, 1660-1700. Southern Illinois University Press, 1960.

1678 plays
West End plays
Plays by Thomas d'Urfey
Restoration comedy